Petroni is an Italian surname. Notable people with the surname include:

Bruno Petroni (1941–2014), Italian footballer
Christian Petroni (born 1984), Italian-American celebrity chef
Doris Petroni (born 1941), Argentine choreographer, dancer, and teacher
Girolamo Petroni (died 1591), Italian Roman Catholic bishop
Giulio Petroni (1917–2010), Italian film director, writer and screenwriter
Luan Peres Petroni (born 1994), Brazilian footballer
Michael Petroni, Australian film director and screenwriter
Pier Paolo Petroni (born 1987), Italian modern pentathlete
Riccardo Petroni (c. 1250 – 1314), Italian cardinal
Victor Petroni (born 1959), Canadian soccer player and manager

Italian-language surnames
Surnames from given names